Maciocia is a surname. Notable people with the surname include:

Cosmo Maciocia (born 1942), Canadian politician
Danny Maciocia (born 1967), Canadian football coach

Italian-language surnames